The 2017 World Aesthetic Gymnastics Championships, the 18th edition of the Aesthetic group gymnastics competition, was held in Helsinki, Finland from May 26 to 28, at the Helsinki Ice Hall.

Participating nations

Medal winners

Results

Senior

The top 12 teams (2 per country) and the host country in Preliminaries qualify to the Finals.

References

External links
http://rgform.eu/result.php?id_prop=384

World Aesthetic Gymnastics Championships
Gymnastics competitions in Finland
International sports competitions in Helsinki
2017 in gymnastics
2017 in Finnish sport
2010s in Helsinki